L'Express de Madagascar is a daily newspaper published in Madagascar. It is primarily published in French, although individual sections and stories are also published in Malagasy.

See also
 List of newspapers in Madagascar

External links
 Online edition of L'Express

Newspapers published in Madagascar
Publications with year of establishment missing
French-language newspapers published in Africa